Now That's What I Call Music! 2, also referred to as Now 2, was released on August 9, 1996. The album is the second edition of the Asia Now That's What I Call Music! series. It sold very well in Asia reaching 4× Platinum in Japan and 3× Platinum and Gold in Taiwan.

South Asia edition track listing
 Queen – "Heaven for Everyone" (5:36)
 Yaki-Da – "I Saw You Dancing" (3:41)
 Ace of Base – "Beautiful Life" (3:41)
 Bon Jovi – "This Ain't a Love Song" (4:20)
 The Cranberries – "Ode to My Family" (4:30)
 Shaggy – "Boombastic" (4:07)
 Roxette – "June Afternoon" (4:15)
 Bryan Adams – "Have You Ever Really Loved a Woman?" (4:52)
 Michael Learns to Rock – "That's Why (You Go Away)" (4:10)
 Tina Turner – "GoldenEye" (4:46)
 Boyzone – "Coming Home Now" (3:43)
 Janet Jackson – "Runaway" (3:34)
 Boyz II Men – "Water Runs Dry" (3:21)
 Portrait – "How Deep Is Your Love"
 Joan Osborne – "One of Us" (5:21)
 Meat Loaf – "I'd Lie for You (And That's the Truth)" (6:40)

Indonesian edition track listing
 Queen – "Heaven for Everyone" (5:36)
 Wet Wet Wet – "Somewhere Somehow" (3:51)
 Ace of Base – "Beautiful Life" (3:41)
 Bon Jovi – "This Ain't a Love Song" (4:20)
 The Cranberries – "Ode to My Family" (4:30)
 Shaggy – "Boombastic" (4:07)
 Roxette – "June Afternoon" (4:15)
 Bryan Adams – "Have You Ever Really Loved a Woman?" (4:52)
 Michael Learns to Rock – "That's Why (You Go Away)" (4:10)
 Tina Turner – "GoldenEye" (4:46)
 Boyzone – "Coming Home Now" (3:43)
 Janet Jackson – "Runaway" (3:34)
 Boyz II Men – "Water Runs Dry" (3:21)
 Blur – "Charmless Man" (3:37)
 Joan Osborne – "One of Us" (5:21)
 Meat Loaf – "I'd Lie for You (And That's the Truth)" (6:40)

Sales and certifications

References

External links
 Now That's What I Call Music! 2 Asia Track List
 Now That's What I Call Music! 2 Indonesia Track List
 Now That's What I Call Music! 2 China Track List

1996 compilation albums
Now That's What I Call Music! albums (Asian series)
EMI Records compilation albums
Virgin Records compilation albums